RC Rickmers was a German five-masted steel clipper barque with auxiliary engine built in 1906 by the firm Rickmers Rice Mill, Freight and Shipbuilding Company (Rickmers Reismühlen Rhederei and Schiffbau A.G., simple known as Rickmers A.G.) of Bremerhaven, Germany for the company's Rickmers Line. She was the largest sailing ship in the world from 1907 (sinking of Thomas W. Lawson) to 1911 (launching of France II) and the second German five-masted barque.

Rickmers A.G. 
Rickmers shipyard was founded by R. C. Rickmers in 1839. In the beginning of the 20th century the shipyard employed some 650 personnel and built several extraordinary large sailing vessels for its parent company's rice trade.

The largest sailing vessel in the world 
R. C. Rickmers was built in 1906 and was the largest ship in the world from 1907, when Thomas W. Lawson sunk and until 1911, when France II was launched. Her captain was August Walsen. She arrived at New York in the fall of 1906 on her maiden voyage from Bremen to Saigon and Bangkok through Cape Horn. Scientific American hosted a featured story about R. C. Rickmers in its October 1906 issue.

Under the sails R. C. Rickmers was able to sail at about 13 to 14 knots with the maximum speed of 17 knots. While using the steam engine she could have been driven at 8 knots without a load and 6 to 7 knots with a cargo.

Voyages 
In the first two and half years in trade she sailed 100,000 miles.

She completed multiple voyages around the world:

 East Asia (Singapore, Kobe and Hiogo, Japan, Saigon on her maiden voyage)
 Far East (Vladivostok) 
U.S. west coast (San Francisco, Los Angeles and Portland, Oregon)
 Australia (New South Wales) and to South America (Chile)

In 1912 and 1913 she made two major trips:

 Cardiff - Philadelphia - Cape of Good Hope - Kobe, Japan - Portland, Oregon - Antwerp
 Cardiff - Philadelphia - Cape of Good Hope - Japan - Vladivostok - Indian Ocean - Hull

Russian Tsar Nicholas II visited the ship during her stay in Vladivostok .

Fate 
At the onset of World War I, in August 1914, R. C. Rickmers was seized by the British Admiralty as a war prize at Cardiff. She was renamed Neath and placed on cargo trade.

All of her crew survived, with the ship's captain being taken prisoner by U-66.

See also
 List of large sailing vessels

References 

1906 ships
Individual sailing vessels
Maritime incidents in 1917
Five-masted ships
Merchant ships of Germany